Poria may refer to:

Names
Poria may refer to a branch or surname of Jethwa.

Places
 Poria - Kfar Avoda, formerly Poria, a village in northern Israel
 Poria - Neve Oved, a village in northern Israel

Biology

 Poria (fungus), a defunct fungal genus subsumed into Perenniporia
 Wolfiporia, a genus of fungi in the family Polyporaceae, particularly Wolfiporia extensa, called poria in the context of Chinese medicine
 Poria (beetle), a genus of beetles in the family Coccinellidae
 Poria (crustacean) (Lang, 1965), a genus in the family Canthocamptidae

See also
 Kākā poria, a small leg ring for parrots made from bone or stone